The following is a list of notable organists from the past and present who perform organ literature.

Living organists

Australia
 David Drury (born 1961)

 Douglas Lawrence (born 1943)
 Graeme Morton
 Christopher Wrench (born 1958)

Austria 
 Martin Haselböck (born 1954)
 Brett Leighton (born 1955)
 Matthias Maierhofer (born 1979)
 Peter Planyavsky (born 1947)

Belgium 
 Jan Van Landeghem (born 1954)
 Ignace Michiels (born 1963)
 Luc Ponet (born 1959)

Bulgaria 

 Alexandra Fol (born 1981)
 Neva Krysteva (born 1946)

Canada 
 Denis Bédard (born 1950)
 Desmond Gaspar (born 1970)
 Paul Halley (born 1952)
 Rachel Mahon (born 1989)
 John Tuttle (born 1946)

Croatia 
 Ivan Božičević (born 1961)
 Pavao Mašić (born 1980)

Czech Republic 
 Pavel Kohout (born 1976)

Denmark 
 Frederik Magle (born 1977)

Finland 
 Kalevi Kiviniemi (born 1958)

France 
 Michel Bouvard (born 1958)
 Thierry Escaich (born 1965)
 Jérôme Faucheur (born 1953)
 Naji Hakim (born 1955)
 Olivier Latry (born 1962)
 Jean-Pierre Leguay (born 1939)
 Michael Matthes (born 1966)
 Thierry Mechler (born 1962)
 Daniel Roth (born 1942)
 Nariné Simonian (born 1966)
 Marina Tchebourkina (born 1965)
 Johann Vexo (born 1978)

Germany 
 Daniel Beckmann (born 1980)
 Andreas Boltz (born 1964)
 Winfried Bönig (born 1959)
 Gabriel Dessauer (born 1955)
 Matthias Eisenberg (born 1956)
 Stefan Engels (born 1967)
 Clemens Ganz (born 1935)
 Zsolt Gárdonyi (born 1946)
 Felix Hell (born 1985)
 Hans Uwe Hielscher (born 1945)
 Rudolf Kelber (born 1948)
 Helmut Kickton (born 1956)
 Otto Maria Krämer (born 1964)
 Edgar Krapp (born 1947)
 Ludger Lohmann (born 1954)
 Petra Morath-Pusinelli (born 1967)
 Mathias Rehfeldt (born 1986)
 Wolfgang Rübsam (born 1946)
 Wolfgang Seifen (born 1956)
 Ludger Stühlmeyer (born 1961)
 Zsigmond Szathmáry (born 1939)
 Elke Voelker (born 1968)
 Harald Vogel (born 1941)
 Martin Welzel (born 1972)

Hungary 
 Laszlo Fassang (born 1973)
 Bálint Karosi (born 1979)
 Balázs Szabó (born 1985)

Italy 
 Domenico Morgante (born 1956)
 Arturo Sacchetti (born 1941)

Ireland 
 Gerard Gillen
 Ronan Murray (born 1977)

Latvia 
 Iveta Apkalna (born 1976)
 Aivars Kalējs (born 1951)
 Jevgenija Lisicina (born 1942)

Monaco (Principality) 
 Marc Giacone (born 1954)

Netherlands 
 Arjan Breukhoven (born 1962)
 Christine Kamp (born 1966)
 Ton Koopman (born 1944)
 Ben van Oosten (born 1955)
 Jan Verschuren (born 1962)
 Sietze de Vries (born 1973)

New Zealand 
 Douglas Mews (born 1956)

Norway 
 Jon Laukvik (born 1952) 
 Kåre Nordstoga (born 1954)

Philippines 
 Armando Salarza (born 1966)

Poland 
 Krzysztof Czerwiński (born 1980)

Russia 
 Marina Tchebourkina (born 1965)

Singapore 
 Evelyn Lim

South Africa 
 Barry Smith (born 1939)

Spain
 Montserrat Torrent i Serra (born 1926)

Sweden 
 Hans Davidsson (born 1958)
 Hans-Ola Ericsson (born 1958)
 Hans Fagius (born 1951)

Switzerland 
 Guy Bovet (born 1942)
 Daniel Chorzempa (born 1944)
 Lionel Rogg (born 1936)

United Kingdom 
 Charles Andrews (born 1989)
 Malcolm Archer (born 1952)
 Martin Baker (born 1967)
 Sarah Baldock (born 1975)
 Harry Bramma (born 1936)
 Kerry Beaumont (born 1957)
 Jonathan Bielby (born 1944)
 Graham Blyth (born 1948)
 Kevin Bowyer (born 1961)
 David Briggs (born 1962)
 John Butt (born 1960)
 Andrew Cantrill
 Ralph Cupper (born 1954)
 Stephen Darlington (born 1952)
 Katherine Dienes (born 1970)
 Clive Driskill-Smith (born 1978)
 Henry Fairs (born 1976)
 Stephen Farr (born 1967)
 Jeremy Filsell (born 1964)
 David Goode (born 1971)
 Paul Hale
 Charles Harrison (born 1974)
 Christopher Herrick (born 1942)
 David Hill (born 1957)
 Daniel Hyde (born 1980)
 Rupert Jeffcoat (born 1970)
 John Kitchen (born 1950)
 James Lancelot (born 1952)
 Anna Lapwood (born 1995)
 Simon Lindley (born 1948)
 Adrian Lucas (born 1962)
 Sarah MacDonald (born 1968)
 Wayne Marshall (born 1961)
 Roy Massey (born 1934)
 Andrew Millington (born 1952)
 Philip Moore (born 1943)
 Greg Morris (born 1976)
 Daniel Moult (born 1973)
 Peter Nardone (born 1965)
 Martin Neary (born 1940)
 Andrew Nethsingha (born 1968)
 Michael Nicholas (born 1938)
 James O'Donnell (born 1961)
 Adrian Partington (born 1958)
 David Price (born 1969)
 Tim Rishton 
 Barry Rose (born 1934)
 Roger Sayer (born 1961)
 Gordon Stewart (born 1952)
 Jeremy Suter
 Anne Marsden Thomas (born 1948)
 Alan Thurlow (born 1947)
 Ian Tracey (born 1955)
 Alan Thurlow (born 1947)
 Thomas Trotter (born 1957)
 Colin Walsh (born 1955)
 Mark Wardell (born 1968)
 Gillian Weir (born 1941)
 John Scott Whiteley (born 1950)
 Marcus Wibberley (born 1981)
 Carol Williams (born 1962)
 Alan Wilson (born 1947)

United States 
 George C. Baker (born 1951)
 Robert Bardwell 
 Diane Meredith Belcher (born 1960)
 James Biery (born 1956)
 Diane Bish (born 1941)
 Cameron Carpenter (born 1981)
 Chelsea Chen (born 1983)
 Clay Christiansen (born 1949)
 James David Christie (born 1952)
 Ken Cowan (born 1974)
 David Dahl (born 1937)
 Richard Elliott (born 1957)
 Martin Ellis (born 1968)
 Jeremy Filsell (born 1964)
 Alexander Frey
 Charles Henry Galloway
 Barbara Harbach (born 1946)
 David Hegarty (born 1945)
 Cory Henry (born 1987)
 David Higgs
 Christopher Houlihan (born 1987)
 Paul Jacobs (born 1977)
 Dennis James (born 1950)
 Martin Jean (born 1960)
 Bálint Karosi (born 1979)
 James Kibbie (born 1949)
 Nathan Laube (born 1988)
 Joan Lippincott (born 1935)
 John Longhurst (born 1940)
 Douglas Major (born 1953)
 Haig Mardirosian (born 1947)
 Alan Morrison (born 1968)
 Michael Murray (born 1943)
 Thomas Murray (born 1943)
 Anthony Newman (born 1941)
 Karel Paukert (born 1935)
 William Porter (born 1946)
 James Thomas Quarles
 George Ritchie
 Catherine Rodland
 Wolfgang Rübsam (born 1946)
 Geoffrey Simon (born 1946)
 Frank Speller (1938–2017)
 Carole Terry (born 1948)
 Kent Tritle (born 1960)
 Andrew E. Unsworth (active from 2001)
 Guy Whatley (born 1975)
 Carol Williams (born 1962)
 Todd Wilson (born 1971)

Deceased organists

Austria 
 Anton Bruckner (1824–1896)
 Hans Haselböck (1928–1954)
 Susi Jeans (1911–1993)

Belgium
 Jacques-Nicolas (Jaak-Nicolaas) Lemmens (1823–1881)

Canada
 Gerald Bales (1919–2002)
 H. Hugh Bancroft (1904–1988)
 Gérard Caron  (1916–1986)
 Douglas Clarke (1893–1962)
 Antoine Dessane (1826–1873)
 Christopher Jackson (1948–2015)
 Ernest MacMillan (1893–1973)
 Theodore Frederic Molt (1795–1856)
 Charles Peaker (1899–1978)
 Healey Willan (1880–1968)

Czech republic (Bohemia) 
 František Xaver Brixi (1732–1771)
 Bohuslav Matej Cernohorsky (1684–1742)
 Petr Eben (1929–2007)
 Josef Seger (1716–1782)

Denmark 
 Grethe Krogh (1928–2018)
 Mogens Wöldike (1897–1988)

France 
 Jehan Alain (1911–1940)
 Marie-Claire Alain (1926–2013)
 Charles-Valentin Alkan (1813–1888)
 Augustin Barié (1883–1915)
 Léon Boëllmann (1862–1897)
 Joseph Bonnet (1884–1944)
 Michel Chapuis (1930–2017)
 Pierre Cochereau (1924–1984)
 Edouard Commette (1883–1967)
 Marie-Anne Couperin (born 1677)
 Jeanne Demessieux (1921–1968)
 Théodore Dubois (1837–1924)
 Marcel Dupré (1886–1971)
 Maurice Duruflé (1902–1986)
 Rolande Falcinelli (1920–2006)
 André Fleury (1903–1995)
 César Franck (1822–1890), from Belgium
 Eugène Gigout (1844–1925)
 Jean Guillou (1930–2019)
 Alexandre Guilmant (1837–1911)
 André Isoir (1935–2016)
 Jean Langlais (1907–1991)
 Marcel Lanquetuit (1894–1985)
 Gaston Litaize (1909–1991)
 Paul de Maleingreau (1887–1956)
 Olivier Messiaen (1908–1992)
 Henri Mulet (1878–1967)
 Pierre Pincemaille (1956–2018)
 René Saorgin (1928–2015)
 Camille Saint-Saëns (1835–1921)
 Albert Schweitzer (1875–1965)
 Louis Thiry (1935–2019)
 Charles Tournemire (1870–1939)
 Louis Vierne (1870–1937)
 Charles-Marie Widor (1844–1937)

Germany 
 Johann Sebastian Bach (1685–1750)
 Joseph Siegmund Bachmann (1754–1825)
 Melchior Hoffmann (1679–1715)
 Gottfried August Homilius (1714–1785)
 Franz Lehrndorfer (1928–2013)
 Theodor Pröpper (1896–1979)
 Karl Richter (1926–1981)
 Karl Straube (1873–1956)
 Käte van Tricht (1909–1996)
 Helmut Walcha (1907–1991)
 Gerd Zacher (1929–2014)

Hungary 
 Franz Liszt (1811–1886)
 János Sebestyén (1931–2012)

Italy 
 Costanzo Antegnati (1549–1624)
 Marco Enrico Bossi (1861–1925)
 Girolamo Frescobaldi (1583–1643)
 Carlo Giorgio Garofalo (1886–1962)
 Fernando Germani (1906–1998)
 Michelangelo Rossi (1601–1656)
 Luigi Ferdinando Tagliavini  (1929-2017)

Netherlands 
 Willem Bartholomeus (1825–1892)
 Klaas Bolt (1927–1990)
 Piet Kee (1927–2018)
 Ewald Kooiman (1938–2009)
 Gustav Leonhardt (1928–2012)
 Liuwe Tamminga (1953–2021)

Nigeria 
 Fela Sowande (1905–1987)

Spain 
 Joan Aulí (1796–1869)

Sweden
 Harald Fryklöf (1882–1918)
 Ferdinand Zellbell the Younger (1719–1780)

Switzerland
 Alfred Baum (1904–1993)
 Fridolin Sicher (1490–1546)

United Kingdom 
 Edward Bairstow (1874–1946)
 Jennifer Bate (1944–2020)
 E. Power Biggs (1906–1977)
 John Birch (1929-2012)
 Hugh Blair (1864-1932)
 Jonathan Blewitt (1782–1853)
 Herbert Brewer (1865-1928)
 William Hutchins Callcott (1807–1882)
 William Carnaby (1772–1839)
 Stephen Cleobury (1948–2019)
 Norman Cocker (1889-1953)
 Marmaduke Conway (1885-1961)
 Melville Cook (1912-1993)
 Robert Cooke (1768–1814)
 Lionel Dakers (1924-2003)
 Nicholas Danby (1935-1997)
 Harold Darke (1888-1976)
 Christopher Dearnley (1930-2000)
 Ralph Downes (1904–1993)
 John Dykes Bower (1905-1981)
 Catherine Ennis (1955-2020)
 Roger Fisher (1936-2021)
 Alfred Robert Gaul (1837–1913)
 Harvey Grace (1874-1944)
 Douglas Guest (1916-1996)
 Joseph John Harris (1799–1869)
 William Henry Harris (1883–1973)
 Joseph Binns Hart (1794–1844)
 Philip Hart (died 1749)
 Basil Harwood (1859–1949)
 James Hawkins (1662–1729)
 Edward Heath (1916-2005)
 James Heseltine (1690–1763)
 John Larkin Hopkins (1819–1873)
 Martin How (1931-2022)
 Michael Howard (1922–2002)
 Herbert Howells (1892-1983)
 Peter Hurford (1930–2019)
 Donald Hunt (1930-2018)
 Randolph Jewett (1602–1675)
 John Keeble (1711–1786)
 Joseph Kelway (1702–1782)
 Thomas Kelway (c. 1695 – 1744)
 Philip Knapton (1788–1833)
 Gerald Knight (1908-1979)
 George Jackson Lambert (1794–1880)
 Richard Langdon (1729–1803)
 Philip Ledger (1937-2012)
 Henry Ley (1904-1993)
 Richard Hey Lloyd (1933-2021)
 William Henry Longhurst (1819–1904)
 Albert Mallinson (1870–1946)
 Colin Mawby (1936-2019)
 Lucian Nethsingha (1936-2021)
 Boris Ord (1897-1961)
 Jane Parker-Smith (1950-2020)
 John Parsons (1563–1623)
 Martin Peerson (c. 1572 – c. 1650)
 Josiah Pittman (1816–1886)
 Simon Preston (1938-2022)
 Henry Purcell (1659–1695)
 James Kendrick Pyne (1852–1938)
 Noel Rawsthorne (1929–2019)
 Vaughan Richardson (died 1729)
 John Robinson (1682–1762)
 Brian Runnett (1935-1970)
 John Sanders (1933-2003)
 David Sanger (1947–2010)
 John Scott (1956–2015)
 Bruce Steane (1866-1938)
 Haldane Campbell Stewart (1868–1942)
 Herbert Sumsion (1899-1995)
 Christopher Tambling (1964-2015)
 George Thalben-Ball (1896–1987)
 Stanley Vann (1910-2010)
 William Litton Viner (1790–1867)
 Henry Walford Davies (1869-1941)
 Thomas Forbes Walmisley (1783–1866)
 Samuel Wesley (1766–1837)
 Samuel Sebastian Wesley (1810–1876)
 Henry Westrop (1812–1879)
 Frederick Wilson Whitehead (1863–1926)
 David Willcocks (1919–2015)
 Arthur Wills (1926-2020)

United States 
 Frank W. Asper (1892-1973)
 Herman Berlinski (1910–2010)
 Leon Berry (1914-1996)
 E. Power Biggs (1906–1977)
 David Boe (1936–2020)
 Catharine Crozier (1914-2003)
 Carlo Curley (1952–2012)
 Garth Edmundson (1892–1971)
 Richard Ellsasser (1926–1972)
 Dan Federici (1950–2008)
 Charles B. Fisk (1925-1983)
 Virgil Fox (1912–1980)
 Harvey Bartlett Gaul (1881–1945)
 Robert Glasgow  (1925-2008)
 Gerre Hancock (1934-2012)
 Eddie Layton (1925–2004)
 Leonard MacClain (1899–1967)
 Byron Melcher (1929–2012)
 T. Tertius Noble (1867–1953)
 Richard Purvis (1913–1994) 
 Alexander Schreiner (1901–1987)
 John Serry, Sr. (1915–2003) 
 Leo Sowerby (1895–1968)
 Frederick Swann (1931–2022)
 Carl Weinrich (1904–1991)
 Berj Zamkochian (1929–2004)

Notes

See also 
 List of organ composers
 Organist
 Organ repertoire
 Organ recital
 Pipe organ

References

 
Organists